Josh Davis (born January 22, 1991) is an American professional basketball player for Cyberdyne Ibaraki Robots in Japan.

Davis played his freshman year at NC State. Davis transferred to Tulane, where he averaged 17.6 points and 10.7 rebounds per game as a junior and was named to the First Team All-Conference USA. After the season he transferred again to San Diego State but did not have to sit out the season. He was nicknamed Kawhi 2.0 due to his resemblance of Kawhi Leonard and rebounding ability. In his only season at San Diego State, Davis averaged 10.1 rebounds and 7.7 points per game. After the season he signed with the San Antonio Spurs but never played for the team.

References

1991 births
Living people
American expatriate basketball people in Japan
American expatriate basketball people in the Philippines
American men's basketball players
Austin Spurs players
Basketball players from Raleigh, North Carolina
Cyberdyne Ibaraki Robots players
Kawasaki Brave Thunders players
Meralco Bolts players
NC State Wolfpack men's basketball players
San Diego State Aztecs men's basketball players
Shimane Susanoo Magic players
Tulane Green Wave men's basketball players
Philippine Basketball Association imports
Power forwards (basketball)